For Better, for Worse (Swedish: I nöd och lust) is a 1938 Swedish drama film directed by Ivar Johansson and starring Sten Lindgren, Mona Mårtenson and Rolf Botvid. It was shot at the Sundbyberg Studios of Europa Film in Stockholm. Location shooting took place in Greenland and off the coast of Norway. The film's sets were designed by the art director Max Linder.

Synopsis
A veteran trapper sits reflectively by the sickbed of his wife and recalls the more than thirty years they have spent together.

Cast
 Sten Lindgren as 	Olaf Ruud
 Mona Mårtenson as 	Anna Ruud
 Rolf Botvid as Erik Ruud
 Sven Bergvall as 	Halvorsen
 Bror Olsson as 	Doctor
 Martin Ericsson as 	Priest
 Märta Dorff as 	Nurse
 Linnéa Hillberg as	Mother Olsen

References

Bibliography 
 Qvist, Per Olov & von Bagh, Peter. Guide to the Cinema of Sweden and Finland. Greenwood Publishing Group, 2000.

External links 
 

1938 films
Swedish drama films
1938 drama films
1930s Swedish-language films
Films directed by Ivar Johansson
Swedish black-and-white films
1930s Swedish films